ETS domain-containing transcription factor ERF is a protein that in humans is encoded by the ERF gene.

References

Further reading

External links 
 

Transcription factors